Sison, officially the Municipality of Sison, is a 3rd class municipality in the province of Pangasinan, Philippines. The town's original name was Alava. According to the 2020 census, it has a population of 52,320 people.

History
Sison was once part of San Fabian until petitioners from Barrio Bolaoen signed a manifesto on June 30, 1858, expressing their intention of creating a separate pueblo. It was petitioned to the gobernadorcillo of San Fabian and was later endorsed to the Alcalde Mayor of Lingayen on August 8, 1858. After the definition of the jurisdiction of the proposed new pueblo, the administrative proceedings began with the mayor of San Fabian himself, Don Enrique Casaoay, as among those who appeared in behalf of the petitioners. On December 15, 1862, a royal decree was finally issued declaring the creation of a pueblo independent of San Fabian's civil jurisdiction. The pueblo was called Alava. Don Faustino Baclit served as its ad interim head until the pueblo's first elected president, Don Felix Genelazo, assumed his office on March 1, 1868.

In 1907, Esperanza, north-east of Alava, was formed into Pinmilapil, Agat, Sagunto, Cauringan, Bila and Colisao (now in San Fabian).  Labayug was formed also into Inmalog, Calunetan, San Andres, Alibeng, Bacayao and Killo. Esperanza and Labayug were joined as Artacho, its poblacion, which become a regular municipality.

On March 25, 1918, Governor General Francis Burton Harrison signed Executive Order No. 12, s. 1918 consolidating the township of Artacho and the municipality of Alava as the Municipality of Sison. Following this incorporation, Alava was renamed Sison in honor of Don Perfecto Sison, first provincial governor of Pangasinan.

Geography
Sison is geographically located on the northern portion of Pangasinan, bordering the provincial boundaries of La Union and Benguet. It has a total land area of 81.88 square kilometers. It is bounded on the north by Rosario (La Union), Tuba (Benguet); on the south by Pozorrubio; on the southeast by San Manuel and Binalonan; on the west by San Fabian.

Barangays
Sison is politically subdivided into barangays. These barangays are headed by elected officials: Barangay Captain, Barangay Council, whose members are called Barangay Councilors. All are elected every three years.

Climate

Demographics

Religion

Diocesan Shrine of Our Lady of Mount Carmel 

The Diocesan Shrine of Our Lady of Mount Carmel (Sison, 2434 Pangasinan) was canonically erected in 1896–1898. It is under the jurisdiction of the Roman Catholic Diocese of Urdaneta (from the Roman Catholic Archdiocese of Lingayen-Dagupan, Archdioecesis Lingayensis-Dagupanensis, created on May 19, 1928, elevated to Archdiocese on February 16, 1963, comprising the capital of the province, 2 cities and 15 municipalities in the central part of Pangasinan; Suffragans: Alaminos, Cabanatuan, San Fernando, La Union, San Jose, Nueva Ecija and Urdaneta; Titular: St. John the Apostle and Evangelist).

The November 20, 1896 Spanish Royal Decree created Alava as a Parish of Diocese of Nueva Segovia. In 1918 the town was renamed to Sison honoring Senator Pedro Ma. Sison.

In 1928 the Parish Church was included into the Diocese of Lingayen-Pangasinan. In the 15th Centenary Anniversary of the Council of Ephesus, the Sison Parish was consecrated under “La Reina Del Monte Carmelo”  (Our Lady of Mount Carmel), forming part of the Roman Catholic Diocese of Urdaneta in 1985. But it was only on its Centennial founding on November 20, 1996, that the Parish Church became a Diocesan Shrine. Its feast day is every 16 July. The Parish Priest is Rev. Fr. Bernardo Villanueva.

Economy

Government

Just as the national government, the municipal government of Sison is divided into three branches: executive, legislative and judiciary. The judicial branch is administered solely by the Supreme Court of the Philippines. The LGUs have control of the executive and legislative branch.

The executive branch is composed of the mayor and the barangay captain for the barangays. The legislative branch is composed of the Sangguniang Bayan (town assembly), and Sangguniang Barangay (barangay council).

The seat of Government is vested upon the Mayor and other elected officers who hold office at the Sison Town hall. The Sanguniang Bayan is the center of legislation, stationed in Sison Legislative Building or Town hall.

Elected officials
Specifically, Sison's mayor and Chief Executive is Danilo "Danny" C. Uy. The sangguniang bayan, the legislative body of the municipality is composed of the municipal vice mayor as the presiding officer, 8 Sanguniang Bayan Members, Indigenous People representative, ABC President, and Sangunian Kabataan (SK) Federation President. (Section 440, Local Government Code of 1991)

Tourism

Sison has the following landmark attractions and events:

Begnas: Sison celebrates the October Begnas festival at the New Public Market yearly with foreign residents participation (Sagada word, "thanksgiving"). National Cultural Minorities under the National Commission on Indigenous Peoples' October joined the yearly event with outsiders from Baguio, Laoac, Pozorrubio, Bago, Kankanaeys, Ibalois and the Aplays.
34th Eastern Pangasinan BSP Mini Jamboree
Antong Falls
Bued Toll Bridge (Pangasinan-La Union boundary) Gloria Macapagal Arroyo (unveiled on June 21, 2010) the newly reconstructed three-span superstructure Bued Bridge marker in Sison, Pangasinan (destroyed by the October 2010 typhoon Pepeng) the restoration of the three-span superstructure started in January 2010(P120-million repair under the President's Bridge Program).

Gallery

See also
List of renamed cities and municipalities in the Philippines

References

External links

 Sison Official Website
  Municipal Profile at the National Competitiveness Council of the Philippines
 Sison at the Pangasinan Government Website
 Local Governance Performance Management System
 [ Philippine Standard Geographic Code]
 Philippine Census Information

Municipalities of Pangasinan